Ellenborough Market, also known as Teochew Market, New Market, Sin Pa Sat and Pasar Bahru, was a market on Ellenborough Street along the Singapore River in Singapore. The market was demolished following a fire in 1968.

History
Construction of a market named after Edward Law, 1st Earl of Ellenborough began in May 1845 by engineer Charles Edward Faber. Faber was criticised for shoddily constructing the market, with cracks in several parts of the walls. An extension was built next to the building in 1899, and was made using a cast iron structure from an exhibition Edinburgh. A proposal for an extension was made in 1947 to modernise the market. Construction of a one-way street around the market was approved in 1952 to speed up deliveries to the market. The market was known for selling seafood, especially fish. The market was also known as Teochew Market, as the area had a high population of Teochews, and was known as Pasar Bahru in Malay and Sin Pa Sat in Hokkien, both of which translate to "New Market".

On 30 January 1968, the market was burned down and subsequently demolished to make way for urban developments. The site of the market is currently occupied by the Swissotel Merchant Court hotel and The Central mall.

Legacy
The Ellenborough Market Cafe in the Swissotel Merchant Court is named after the market.

References

Buildings and structures in Singapore
1845 establishments in Singapore
1968 disestablishments in Singapore
19th-century architecture in Singapore